The Lausanne Congress of 1875 was a historic effort of eleven Supreme Councils to review and reform the Grand Constitutions of The Ancient and Accepted Scottish Rite of Freemasonry
of 1786.  The Congress took place from 6–22 September 1875 with representation from the Supreme Councils of England (and Wales), Belgium, Cuba, Scotland, France, Greece, Hungary, Italy, Peru, Portugal and the hosting nation, Switzerland.  The Scottish representative, who also represented the Supreme Council of Greece, left before the Congress reached its conclusion.  On the closing date, nine representatives signed the final Declaration and Treaty.

Although many different aspects were discussed, concerns over the Deistic approach of a belief in a Creative Principle on the one hand and the Theistic approach of a belief in a Supreme Being on the other took such a precedence as to hinder other proceedings, and it was not until 1877 that through mediation of the Swiss Supreme Council a conciliatory position on the matter was reached.

Largely unknown to Freemasons these days, the Lausanne Congress and the events leading up to it, both on the European mainland and in the United States, as well as developments after its conclusion provide a remarkable insight into the politics of Grand Lodge foreign relations.

External links:- 
NOTE: The Bernheim Article & Annexes (3-10) are in French, but are relevant in that they cite extensive correspondence between the English and American Jurisdictions - in English.
 THE LAUSANNE CONGRESS. 2011. THE LAUSANNE CONGRESS. [ONLINE] Available at: http://www.freemasons-freemasonry.com/17carvalho.html. [Accessed 10 March 2011].
 The Politics of Grand Lodge Foreign Relations. 2011. The Politics of Grand Lodge Foreign Relations. [ONLINE] Available at: http://www.freemasons-freemasonry.com/masonic_foreign_recognitions.html. [Accessed 10 March 2011].
 Le Convent des Supremes Conseils du Rite Ecossais Ancien et Accepte - Lausanne (6-22 septembre 1875). 2011. Le Convent des Supremes Conseils du Rite Ecossais Ancien et Accepte - Lausanne (6-22 septembre 1875). [ONLINE] Available at: http://www.freemasons-freemasonry.com/bernheim_convent01.html. [Accessed 10 March 2011].
 Le Convent des Supremes Conseils du Rite Ecossais Ancien et Accepte - Lausanne (part 2). 2011. Le Convent des Supremes Conseils du Rite Ecossais Ancien et Accepte - Lausanne (part 2). [ONLINE] Available at: http://www.freemasons-freemasonry.com/bernheim_convent02.html. [Accessed 10 March 2011].
 Le Convent des Supremes Conseils du Rite Ecossais Ancien et Accepte - Lausanne (part 3). 2011. Le Convent des Supremes Conseils du Rite Ecossais Ancien et Accepte - Lausanne (part 3). [ONLINE] Available at: http://www.freemasons-freemasonry.com/bernheim_convent03.html. [Accessed 10 March 2011].
 Annex 1 - Le Convent des Supremes Conseils du Rite Ecossais Ancien et Accepte - Lausanne. 2011. Annex 1 - Le Convent des Supremes Conseils du Rite Ecossais Ancien et Accepte - Lausanne. [ONLINE] Available at: http://www.freemasons-freemasonry.com/bernheim_convent_annexes01.html. [Accessed 10 March 2011].
 Annex 2 - Le Convent des Supremes Conseils du Rite Ecossais Ancien et Accepte - Lausanne. 2011. Annex 2 - Le Convent des Supremes Conseils du Rite Ecossais Ancien et Accepte - Lausanne. [ONLINE] Available at: http://www.freemasons-freemasonry.com/bernheim_convent_annexes02.html. [Accessed 10 March 2011].
 Annex 3 - Le Convent des Supremes Conseils du Rite Ecossais Ancien et Accepte - Lausanne. 2011. Annex 3 - Le Convent des Supremes Conseils du Rite Ecossais Ancien et Accepte - Lausanne. [ONLINE] Available at: http://www.freemasons-freemasonry.com/bernheim_convent_annexes03.html. [Accessed 10 March 2011].
 Annex 4 - Le Convent des Supremes Conseils du Rite Ecossais Ancien et Accepte - Lausanne. 2011. Annex 4 - Le Convent des Supremes Conseils du Rite Ecossais Ancien et Accepte - Lausanne. [ONLINE] Available at: http://www.freemasons-freemasonry.com/bernheim_convent_annexes04.html. [Accessed 10 March 2011].
 Note sur la creation des Supremes Conseils d'Irlande, d'Ecosse et d'Angleterre. 2011. Note sur la creation des Supremes Conseils d'Irlande, d'Ecosse et d'Angleterre. [ONLINE] Available at: http://www.freemasons-freemasonry.com/bernheim_convent_annexes05.html. [Accessed 10 March 2011].

Freemasonry
September 1875 events
1875 in Switzerland
1875 conferences